Young Celts is a 2008 studio album by Scottish brother band The MacDonald Brothers, who were contestants on The X Factor. The album was released on 13 October 2008.

Background
Young Celts was released on October 13, 2008 by The Music Kitchen. The album, featuring mostly Scottish songs (hence the title), featuring songs such as "Loch Lomond" and other songs such as "I'm Gonna Be (500 Miles)" (by The Proclaimers) and "Ae Fond Kiss".

Album recording
The album was recorded after the release of their third album With Love which was released earlier in 2008.

Track listing
Second Hand News
Flower of Scotland
You Can Always Come Home Son
I'm Gonna Be (500 Miles)
Turn Out the Light
Loch Lomond
So Young
Ae Fond Kiss
Me And Rose
Wild Mountain Thyme
Celtic Mantra
Movin' On
Scottish and Proud of It
Caledonia
Celtic Reel
Music of Spey

See also
 The Macdonald Brothers

References

The MacDonald Brothers albums
2008 albums